Mirage is a chocolate bar made by Nestlé and primarily sold in Canada. It is a long chocolate bar with a trapezoidal shape, filled with bubbles.  

The chocolate bar is made by Nestlé Canada. It is manufactured in a peanut-free facility. It is sold in a yellow-white wrapper.  

The Mirage is in many ways similar to the Aero bar, also made by Nestlé. However, the Mirage is quite a bit thicker than the Aero bar, and is not segmented or divided into pieces.

External links
Nestlé Page on the Mirage Bar

Brand name confectionery
Chocolate bars
Nestlé brands
Canadian confectionery